Pettit Brook is a river that converges with West Kill east of Spruceton, New York.

References 

Rivers of New York (state)
Rivers of Greene County, New York